Raymond Clevenger may refer to:
Raymond C. Clevenger (born 1937), American jurist on the United States Court of Appeals for the Federal Circuit
Raymond F. Clevenger (1926–2016), U.S. Representative from Michigan